is a Japanese freestyle skier. She competed in the 2018 Winter Olympics in the women's halfpipe.

References

1990 births
Living people
Freestyle skiers at the 2018 Winter Olympics
Freestyle skiers at the 2022 Winter Olympics
Japanese female freestyle skiers
Olympic freestyle skiers of Japan